Alex "Feather" Akimov (born May 28, 1986) is a Russian–American guitarist and composer who has been active in the music industry for nearly ten years as a touring musician, a session guitarist and a solo artist in his own right. Akimov has appeared on eleven studio albums, has played hundreds of live performances across the United States, and has collaborated with a wide variety of notable artists, including Steve Vai, Britney Spears and Rihanna. Akimov has repeatedly stated that The Beatles have played a hugely influential role in his musical development, whilst also publicly acknowledging Greg Howe as a favorite guitarist.

Education
Akimov started playing the guitar when he was 11 years old. In 2006, he graduated from Gnessin State Musical College in Moscow, Russia, with a BA degree in Classical guitar, Jazz guitar and composition. In September 2006, Akimov moved to Los Angeles to study at the Los Angeles Music Academy College of Music (LAMA). It was at the Los Angeles academy that he learned from great teachers such as Frank Gambale, Steve Fister, Greg Howe and many others. After graduating from LAMA in 2008, Alex started working as a full-time musician.

Recording, touring and other collaborations
In 2008, Akimov was hired to work with Ziv during the band's national tour of the United States (US). The guitarist subsequently appeared on two of Ziv's records, Fearless and Paper & Sound, with the former awarded the "Best Independent Record of the Year" by a music website. Akimov proceeded to perform more than a hundred shows around the US with Ziv, before ceasing work with the band in 2010. He then commenced working with a Russian artist, three-time Russian Grammy Award winner, Irene Nelson. Nelson's music video for her debut single, "Sunrise", aired on MTV Russia and Muz-Tv, and eventually placed in the Billboard Dance Charts. In 2011, Akimov toured with the Red Elvises in the US and Russia. 

In 2013, Akimov joined Mika Newton project signed to JK Music Group / Friendship Collective label owned by Randy Jackson. He took position of a guitarist and music director. In 2014, Akimov joined a worldwide talent search and development company, Isina, and those involved with Isina include Kenny "Babyface" Edmonds, Walter Afanasieff, Kenny G, Humberto Gatica, and Paul Oakefold.

In 2015, he became a manager of a boyband, New District. The band got nominated for the Teen Choice Awards "Choice Next Big Thing"  performed shows with Fifth Harmony, Troye Sivan, Ruth B and many others. In 2016, New District won  Bravo Otto Award in the category "Superband" The band's first single got a major radio airplay around the U.S. and Canada including Radio Disney and performed at KIIS FM "Next Up"

Projects
2008 – 2009 Ziv – Lead Guitar
2009 – 2010 Irene Nelson – Guitarist, manager 
2010 – Eminem FT Rihanna "Love The Way You Lie" Heavy Remix 
2010 – Eminem FT Rihanna  "Love The Way You Lie" Part 2  – Guitarist
2011 – "Search" Ft Greg Howe 
2012 – "Beautiful Lani (featuring Frank Gambale)" 
2010 – 2013 Red Elvises Guitar player world tour 
2013 "The talented" Sony action cam project 
2013 Mika Newton Guitarist/music director 
2015 New District Boy Band Manager

Solo career
Akimov appeared as a guitarist in the 2008 film Live Fast, Die Young by Christopher Showerman.

His debut single "All About The Rain" was released in November 2010, produced by Alex Feather Akimov, Brian Duffy, and Brian Garcia. His second single "Search,"  a collaboration with guitar virtuoso Greg Howe, was released in March 2011. In June 2011, the third single  "Troublemaker" and the final video of the trilogy were officially released. The album About the Rain was released on iTunes in July 2011.

The first single "Beautiful Lani (featuring Frank Gambale)" from his album Eatmystrings has been released on iTunes along with an official music video in February 2012.

Second single called "Monsters are Here" was released on iTunes in September 2012 The video has become viral on YouTube and received 700,000 views in only three weeks
 
In 2013, Akimov joined a project by Sony called "The Talented". He was capturing seven days of a session musician's life that captured his studio works, live performances and rehearsals with different artists.

Teaching
Between 2011 and 2012, Akimov was teaching at guitar master class, an online guitar lessons community.

References

External links 

1986 births
American male guitarists
American record producers
Living people
American session musicians
Talent managers
21st-century American guitarists
21st-century American male musicians
Russian emigrants to the United States